Water Witch Club Casino is located in Highlands, Monmouth County, New Jersey. The building was built in 1905 and was added to the National Register of Historic Places on August 13, 1990.

References

External links

Shingle Style architecture in New Jersey
Colonial Revival architecture in New Jersey
Buildings and structures completed in 1905
Buildings and structures in Monmouth County, New Jersey
Highlands, New Jersey
Clubhouses on the National Register of Historic Places in New Jersey
National Register of Historic Places in Monmouth County, New Jersey
New Jersey Register of Historic Places
American Craftsman architecture in New Jersey
1905 establishments in New Jersey